During the 1990–91 English football season, Leicester City F.C. competed in the Football League Second Division.

Season summary
David Pleat oversaw one of Leicester's most unsuccessful periods in its history during the 1990–91 season. He was sacked in January 1991 after a 3–1 defeat at home to Blackburn Rovers left Leicester fourth from bottom. Gordon Lee was put in charge of the club until the end of the season. Leicester won their final game of the season which guided them clear of relegation to the third tier of the Football League at the expense of West Bromwich Albion.

Final league table

Results
Leicester City's score comes first

Legend

Football League Second Division

FA Cup

League Cup

Full Members Cup

Squad

Left club during season

nat=eng|pos st Daniel Pickering

References

Leicester City F.C. seasons
Leicester City